John Graham Surtees Stelling (23 May 1924 – 29 March 1993) was an English footballer who played for Sunderland as a full back. He signed from Sunderland after being found playing for Non League side Usworth Colliery after the Second World War. Stelling made his first appearance for Sunderland on 5 January 1946 against Grimsby Town in a 3–1 win at Blundell Park. During his time at Sunderland spanning from 1946 until 1956 he had made 259 league appearances scoring 8 goals. Shortly after he retired from playing football in 1956.

References

1924 births
English footballers
People from Washington, Tyne and Wear
Footballers from Tyne and Wear
Sunderland A.F.C. players
1993 deaths
Association football fullbacks